Holland Norway Lines is a Dutch startup ferry operator which operates a passenger and car ferry service between Eemshaven, The Netherlands and Kristiansand, Norway three times a week since 7 April 2022.

The company has chartered the cruise ferry  from the Estonian company Tallink Grupp for an initial period of three years. The ship has a maximum capacity of 1500 passengers and 350 cars. A trip takes about 18 hours from one way to another.

The Company is founded by Bart Cunnen, and Patrick America. In the same interview, it is also stated that by 2027 the company aims to operate emissions-free ships.

Cancelled Sailings 

Early 2023 the ferry from Eemshaven to Kristiansand Holland Norway Lines faced several cancellations because the ship MS Romantika was unable to moor in Eemshaven on several occasions. 

The trouble for the ferry service from Eemshaven to Norway is caused by the fact that since October it no longer has priority to moor at the so-called heavy quay in Eemshaven.

Fleet

Current fleet

References

External links 
 Official website

Ferry companies of the Netherlands